ZERO1: The Art and Technology Network is a 501(c)(3) non-profit organization dedicated to connecting creative explorers from art, science, and technology to provoke new ideas that serve to shape a more resilient future.

History 
In 1995 high tech marketing pioneer Andy Cunningham, who had been instrumental to the success of companies such as Apple, Cisco, and HP, was inspired to bring artists and technologists together to explore and incubate art and ideas that would change the world. Five years later, Andy Cunningham, launched ZERO1 to encourage creativity at the intersection of art and technology and to produce a major festival celebrating this creative intersection.

The organization convenes artists and technologists, presents their collaborative efforts, sponsors artistic initiatives and exhibits the resulting work to the public. ZERO1 is the producer of ZERO1 Biennial, a multi-disciplinary, multi-venue event of visual and performing arts, the moving image, public art and interactive digital media.

ZERO1 Biennial History 
Established in 2006, the ZERO1 Biennial has presented the work of more than 650 artists from more than 60 countries, commissioned over 120 original works of art, attracted over 170,000 visitors from around the world, and contributed approximately $30 million in economic revenue to the region. The ZERO1 Biennial, distributed throughout Silicon Valley and the greater Bay Area, is North America's most significant and comprehensive showcase of work at the nexus of art and technology. Through curated exhibitions, public art installations, performances, and speaker events, the ZERO1 Biennial presents work by a global community of innovative artists who are reshaping contemporary culture.

2012 ZERO1 Biennial - Seeking Silicon Valley 
The 2012 Biennial invited more than 150 artists from over 13 countries to present works at the forefront of media art – collaborating with local, regional, national and international cultural institutions and iconic Silicon Valley companies to showcase three months of exhibitions, events, and performances. The core Biennial exhibition, also entitled Seeking Silicon Valley, was collectively curated by five international curators and included 24 international artists from 11 different countries, including 18 original commissions. 51 Biennial projects were installed in public space, 28 of those public art projects were for (e)MERGE, the ZERO1 Street festival, that engaged 86 collaborating artists.

2010 ZERO1 Biennial - Build Your Own World 
In September 2010 over 47,000 visitors engaged with over 100 artists, designers, engineers, filmmakers, musicians, architects and avant-garde creators from 21 countries, as they proved that art can be more than merely aesthetically pleasing, but rather a tool with which to Build Your Own World. Led by ZERO1 Artistic Director, Steve Dietz, in his third and final year with the Biennial, Assistant Curator Jaime Austin, and ZERO1's Executive Director Joel Slayton, the 2010 ZERO1 Biennial featured works by art and design luminaries David Rockwell and The Lab, Brody Condon, Natalie Jeremijenko, Rigo23, Todd Chandler, Blast Theory and many more. The 2010 Biennial also included a digital art collector's panel, Still Life with Banquet, the city's first zipline over a man-made marsh, a drive-in theater fashioned out of salvaged cars, and AbsoluteZERO an evening street fair of emerging artists.

Bay Lights 
The Bay Lights is an iconic light sculpture celebrating the 75th anniversary of the Bay Bridge in San Francisco by artist Leo Villareal. The sculpture is 1.8 miles wide and 500 feet high incorporating 25,000 individually programmed LED lights driven by a complex set of algorithms and patterns in a dazzling display across the bridge's west span. ZERO1 was invited to be the fiscal sponsor, contracted with Illuminate the Arts, to provide fiscal stewardship for the world's largest light sculpture and currently the nation's largest public art project.

2008 ZERO1 Biennial - Global Festival of Art on the Edge 
From June 4–8, 2008 over 25,000 attendees, visited 100 art installations, 25+ performances, workshops, and public talks by over 100 artists from more than a dozen countries at exhibitions held throughout downtown San Jose; students from seven continents participated in a global youth digital arts exhibition designed to enable them to examine critical issues, share their views, and take action; the biennial commissioned over 19 new works, of which three were the result of a FUSE: CADRE/Montalvo Artist Research Residency Initiative, and supported an additional 29 projects.

2006 ZERO1 Biennial - First ZERO1 Biennial in conjunction with ISEA 2006 
The inaugural 2006 Biennial held in conjunction with the International Society for Electronic Arts brought over 20,000 people to San Jose for seven days of art and interactivity. It featured 250 art installations representing 40 countries. The 2006 Biennial yielded nearly 100 media stories including a full-page spread in the Sunday New York Times, and was recognized as North America's newest and largest digital arts biennial.

Programs

American Arts Incubator (AAI) 
ZERO1 in partnership with the U.S. State Department’s Bureau of Educational and Cultural Affairs (ECA) launched a new media and mural arts program, American Arts Incubator.
Inspired by the “business incubator” model made popular by Silicon Valley's technology and start-up companies, American Arts Incubator is a hybrid training lab, production workshop, and tool for public engagement. It showcases artists as engaged and innovative partners in addressing social issues, in addition to creating a cross-cultural exchange of ideas.

The selected U.S. artists team up with youth and under served populations, through country-based partnerships, to inspire creative ideas for community engagement through art programs. American Arts Incubator awards micro-grants to community-driven digital media or mural arts projects proposed by artist teams who reside in each overseas community. In doing so, the program creates opportunities for innovation by translating creative practices into community-driven artworks and ongoing arts programming that will bolster local economies, influence public policy, and further social change.

ZERO1 Fellowship 
The ZERO1 Fellowship program was developed as a platform for artistic experimentation that recognizes the artist as the ultimate provocateur, risk-taker, and untapped resource of innovation. Working in collaboration with partner companies, cultural institutions, and academic research centers, ZERO1 Fellows are asked to cultivate lines of artistic research and cultural production in response to a specific innovation challenge. ZERO1 Fellows participate in cross-sector collaboration and problem solving while leveraging emerging technology, resources and expertise provided by sponsors. The Fellowship network is further informed by ZERO1 exhibitions, talks, publishing, and special events that establish context and serve to inspire.

ZERO1 Garage 
In 2012 ZERO1 launched the Garage to complement the Biennial as the next phase in the organization's evolution. The ZERO1 Garage was created as a platform where the principles of artistic creativity could be applied to real world innovation challenges. The Garage's unique design, by architect Chris Haas, received a 2013 Merit Award from the AIA San Francisco's Design Award Program. Part research lab, part exhibitions center, the ZERO1 Garage was both a physical space and a conceptual platform where exhibitions, artist talks, panels, and symposia could take place for the next three years.

References

External links 
ZERO1 Official Site
ZERO1 Biennial Official Site

Non-profit organizations based in California